Gogeldrie is a town community in the central north part of the Riverina and situated about 11 kilometres west of Leeton and 11 kilometres east of Whitton.  At the 2021 census, Gogeldrie had a population of 65 people.

Gogeldrie Post Office opened on 15 May 1933 and closed in 1945.

Notes and references

Towns in the Riverina
Towns in New South Wales
Leeton Shire